In algebraic geometry, a Seshadri constant is an invariant of an ample line bundle L at a point P on an algebraic variety. It was introduced by Demailly to measure a certain rate of growth, of the tensor powers of L, in terms of the jets of the sections of the Lk. The object was the study of the Fujita conjecture.

The name is in honour of the Indian mathematician C. S. Seshadri.

It is known that Nagata's conjecture on algebraic curves is equivalent to the assertion that for more than nine general points, the Seshadri constants of the projective plane are maximal. There is a general conjecture for algebraic surfaces, the Nagata–Biran conjecture.

Definition
.

When  is an abelian variety, it can be shown that  is independent of the point chosen, and it is written simply .

References

Algebraic varieties
Vector bundles
Mathematical constants